Restrepia citrina is an orchid, close related to the pleurothallinids (subtribe Pleurothallidinae).

The epithet 'citrina' (lemon-yellow) refers to the color of the lip.

This rare epiphytic species is endemic to the cool, damp montane forests of the Eastern Cordillera of Colombia at altitudes of about 2,600 m.

This tiny orchid lacks pseudobulbs. The erect, thick, leathery leaf is elliptic-ovate in shape. The aerial roots seem like fine hairs.

The flowers develop one at a time at the base of the leaf. They are borne on a slender peduncle, originating from the base of the back of the leaf. The long and purple dorsal sepal is erect and ends in a somewhat thicker club-shaped tip. They have fused lateral sepals (synsepals), which splits slightly at its end. They are quite colorful : yellow overlaid with contrasting reddish-purple spots.  The long, lateral purple petals equally end in a thickened club-shaped tip. The shorter lip is ovoid. It shows the same variations in color and markings.

References 

Endemic orchids of Colombia
citrina
Epiphytic orchids